Cassiopea (upside-down jellyfish) is a genus of true jellyfish and the only members of the family Cassiopeidae. They are found in warmer coastal regions around the world, including shallow mangrove swamps, mudflats, canals, and turtle grass flats in Florida, and the Caribbean and Micronesia. The medusa usually lives upside-down on the bottom, which has earned them the common name. These jellyfish partake in a symbiotic relationship with photosynthetic dinoflagellates and therefore, must lie upside-down in areas with sufficient light penetration to fuel their energy source. Where found, there may be numerous individuals with varying shades of white, blue, green and brown.

Species 
According to the World Register of Marine Species, this genus includes 8 species:

 Cassiopea andromeda (Forsskål, 1775)—Indo-Pacific, introduced in the Mediterranean
 Cassiopea depressa  Haeckel, 1880—Western Indian Ocean off the African coast
 Cassiopea frondosa (Pallas, 1774)—Western Atlantic, Caribbean Sea
 Cassiopea maremetens Gershwin, Zeidler & Davie, 2010—Western Pacific Ocean, off the Australian Coast
 Cassiopea medusa Light, 1914—Pacific Ocean, Philippines and Palau Region
 Cassiopea mertensi Brandt, 1838—Pacific Ocean Southern Micronesia
 Cassiopea ndrosia Agassiz & Mayer, 1899—Pacific Ocean, Australia and Fiji
 Cassiopea ornata Haeckel, 1880—Pacific Ocean, Palau, Philippines, Okinawa
 Cassiopea xamachana Bigelow, 1892—Caribbean Sea and the Northern Atlantic Area of the West indies

Defense system 
Cassiopea species have a mild sting since they are primarily photosynthetic, but sensitive individuals may have a stronger reaction. The photosynthesis occurs because, like most corals, they host zooxanthellae in their tissues. The stinging cells are also found in cellular masses, dubbed "cassiosomes", excreted in a mucus; people swimming near the jellyfish may come in contact with these cassiosomes and be stung. The stings, appearing in the form of a red rash-like skin irritation, are known for being extraordinarily itchy. Sometimes this jellyfish is picked up by the crab Dorippe frascone and carried on its back. The crab uses the jellyfish to defend itself against possible predators.

Behavior
Certain species of Cassiopea have been observed to enter a sleep state - exhibiting decreased pulsation rate, reduced responsiveness to stimuli, and compensatory rebound sleep after deprivation.

References

External links 

 Photo of a Crab carrying an Upside Down Jellyfish (Cassiopea andromeda)
 Bernice Pauahi Bishop Museum entry on Cassiopea andromeda
 A Symbiotic Lifestyle: C. xamachana and Zooxanthellae

 
Cassiopeidae